Cheng Shifa (1921 – June 17, 2007) was a Chinese calligrapher, painter, and cartoonist.

Cheng was born in a small Chinese village outside the city of Shanghai in 1921, in modern Fengjing township. He originally studied medicine before deciding to focus on art. He graduated from Shanghai Art College in 1941. Cheng staged his first art show in 1942.

Cheng was originally known as an illustrator. He initially gained attention for illustrating short stories for Lu Xun, who is considered to be one of the 20th century's best known Chinese satirists. However, Cheng ultimately became best known for his traditional brush paintings of minority ethnic groups from Yunnan, a southwestern border province known for its ethnic diversity. Cheng's work stressed the unity and connection between different ethnic groups, winning Cheng awards from the government.

Cheng died at a hospital in Shanghai on June 17, 2007, of an undisclosed illness.

References

1921 births
2007 deaths
Republic of China painters
Painters from Shanghai
Republic of China calligraphers
People's Republic of China calligraphers